Giovanni "Gianni" Alemanno (born 3 March 1958) is an Italian politician  who from April 2008 until June 2013 was Mayor of Rome for the centre-right People of Freedom.

He was the Secretary of the National Movement for Sovereignty from 2017 to 2019.

Career
At an early age Alemanno joined the neo-fascist/post-fascist Italian Social Movement, and although arrested three times he was never convicted. The first arrest took place in Rome on 20 November 1981, when he was accused (along with four others) of intimidating a 23-year-old student, Dario D'Andrea, who was hit on the head by Sergio Mariani, then secretary of the Fronte della Gioventù (the youth organization of the Italian Social Movement). Mariani was sentenced, while Alemanno was acquitted. The second time was in 1982, when Alemanno was accused of throwing a Molotov cocktail at the Soviet Union embassy. According to other sources, his arrest followed a brawl that broke out during a protest against the USSR. Despite being sentenced to eight months in Rebibbia Prison, he was subsequently acquitted. Alemanno became national secretary of the youth organization of the party in 1988. After being elected regional deputy of Lazio in 1990, he was elected for the first time to the Chamber of Deputies in the 1994 general election.

In 1995 he joined the newly formed National Alliance party, which succeeded the Italian Social Movement following its repudiation of extremism at the Congress of Fiuggi in the 1994. Together with Francesco Storace, he founded Social Right, a national- and social-conservative faction within National Alliance.

Between 2001 and 2006, Alemanno was Minister of Agriculture under Silvio Berlusconi (in Berlusconi's 2nd and 3rd cabinets).

Mayor of Rome
After having been heavily defeated by Walter Veltroni in the 2006 mayoral election of Rome, in April 2008 he defeated Francesco Rutelli and became Mayor of the city. Alemanno rejected a formal alliance with the far-right party, but his critics emphasized that his victory was greeted by crowds of supporters, among them far right skinheads, who chanted "Duce! Duce!" and raised their arms in a fascist salute; then Alemanno said: "People calling me Duce make me laugh. I’m not at all fascist and I think that today the word belongs to the history books. I’ve grown to hate all forms of totalitarianism, whether of the left or of the right".

In August 2008, Alemanno ignited controversy over immigration and the status of Romani people in Italy, when a group of Romani men attacked a Dutch couple that had been camping outside Rome. The couple were beaten and robbed and the woman was raped. Alemanno stated that the couple had been "very careless" by camping in an area "forgotten by God and man" where camping was illegal.
Alemanno said that the attack was an isolated case, and repeated that he wanted to crack down on crime, regaining total control of the territory.

In November 2008, Alemanno decided to build a museum dedicated to the memory of the Holocaust in a Roman park. The leader of Rome's Jewish community, Riccardo Pacifici, praised the mayor for this project.

Alemanno is the son-in-law of Pino Rauti, a former leader of the Italian Social Movement. He always wears a necklace with a Celtic cross. He stated he wears it only as a religious symbol and because of a personal meaning for him, being a jewel worn by his friend Paolo di Nella, a far-right militant who had been killed during the 1970s Anni di Piombo.

The approval of the Romans to the mayor Alemanno rose to 60% in January 2009.

In February 2009 Alemanno conferred honorary citizenship to Dalai Lama, leader of the Tibetan government-in-exile. In July 2009, Alemanno conferred honorary citizenship to captive Israeli soldier Gilad Shalit.

Other important measures of the Alemanno Administration were: an ordinance against prostitution in the streets, an attempt to recapitalize the municipal company AMA redefining its role, the census and the dismantling of six camps for nomads  (including the Casilino 900) setting up garrisons, thus ensuring immunizations and education for Romani children, and to expel illegal immigrants. In August 2012 was approved the "family quotient", introduced by Alemanno to balance the waste charge according to economic situation, number of components, and any health burdens, of Roman families.

Among the projects of Alemanno as a mayor was the construction of a tourist amusement park dedicated to ancient Rome.

In 2004 to encourage and patronage the Italian Mountaineering Expedition and Delegates bound for K2 he arrived Pakistan for participation in celebration of K2 Golden Jubilee ceremony at Concordia base camp.Alpine Club of Pakistan marked a friendship expedition headed by Hayatullah Khan Durrani as chief of Pakistan National mountaineering team to represent Pakistan in Golden Jubilee ceremony of k2 mount.

Judicial proceedings
In late 2014, Alemanno was investigated in the 2014 Rome corruption scandal, involving an external cooperation in a mafia association. On 23 March 2015 he was indicted along with seven other people due to an alleged illicit funding received for the Lazio regional elections of the 2010 that would have been masked by a false poll in favor of Renata Polverini's list. Alemanno says: "I have never called for or received unlawful financing, this is a marginal event I could not verify the legal requirements because it was not about my election campaign." On 18 December 2015, he was indicted for corruption and illicit financing. According to the accusation, Alemanno received €125,000 from the cooperatives' boss Salvatore Buzzi. On 7 February 2017, the allegation of an external cooperation in a mafia association was filed, including the allegations of corruption and illicit funding.

In February 2019 Alemanno was sentenced to six years in prison for corruption and illicit financing in the Mafia Capitale trial. After the sentence, Alemanno resigned as secretary of the National Movement for Sovereignty.

Electoral history

First-past-the-post elections

Writings 
 
  
 
 
  (Proceedings of the conference of Orvieto (Terni) in 2004)

References

External links

 Website of Alemanno 
 CityMayors profile
 BBC Assignment programme

1958 births
Living people
People from Bari
Italian Social Movement politicians
National Alliance (Italy) politicians
The People of Freedom politicians
National Action (Italy) politicians
National Movement for Sovereignty politicians
Agriculture ministers of Italy
Deputies of Legislature XII of Italy
Deputies of Legislature XIII of Italy
Deputies of Legislature XIV of Italy
Deputies of Legislature XV of Italy
Deputies of Legislature XVI of Italy
Mayors of Rome